Roland 'Rolli' Wabra (25 November 1935 in Prague – 17 October 1994) was a German football player. He spent six seasons in the Bundesliga with 1. FC Nürnberg.

Honours
1. FC Nürnberg
 Bundesliga: 1967–68
 DFB-Pokal: 1961–62

External links
 

1935 births
1994 deaths
German footballers
Road incident deaths in Germany
1. FC Nürnberg players
Bundesliga players
Association football goalkeepers